Aytugan (Aytuğan) is a rural locality (a village) in Meleuzovsky Selsoviet, Meleuzovsky District, Bashkortostan, Russia. The population was 107 as of 2010. There is 1 street.

Geography 
Aytugan is located 11 km northeast of Meleuz (the district's administrative centre) by road. Malomukachevo is the nearest rural locality.

References 

Rural localities in Meleuzovsky District